Ying E. Zhang is a Chinese-American biochemist specialized in TGF-beta signaling and functions of ubiquitin E3 ligase Smurfs to better understand cancer cells and metastasis. She is a senior investigator in the Laboratory of Cellular and Molecular Biology at the National Cancer Institute.

Education 
Zhang received her B.S. degree in chemistry and M.S. degree in biochemistry from Peking University. She obtained her Ph.D. degree from University of Wisconsin–Madison in 1995. Her dissertation was titled, Insights into mechanisms of F1F0ATP synthase by genetic analysis of subunit C from Escherichia coli.

Career and research 
Zhang joined the National Cancer Institute's (NCI) Laboratory of Cellular and Molecular Biology in 2000 as a tenure-track investigator and became a senior investigator in 2007.

Zhang's research focuses on understanding TGF-beta signaling and functions of ubiquitin E3 ligase Smurfs. She identified and characterized several key molecules in the TGF-beta signaling pathway, including Smads and Smurfs. Discoveries from her group generated mechanistic insight into how TGF-beta controls cellular responses through Smad-dependent and -independent pathways in normal and cancer cells. On the front of Smurf E3 ligases, their findings extended the function of Smurfs beyond TGF-beta pathway to genome stability and metastasis. In 2020, she was elected Fellow of the American Institute for Medical and Biological Engineering. She was elected a Fellow of the American Association for the Advancement of Science in 2021.

References 

Living people
Year of birth missing (living people)
Place of birth missing (living people)
Peking University alumni
University of Wisconsin–Madison alumni
National Institutes of Health people
American people of Chinese descent
People's Republic of China emigrants to the United States
American women biochemists
Chinese biochemists
21st-century American women scientists
21st-century Chinese scientists
Fellows of the American Institute for Medical and Biological Engineering
21st-century American biologists
21st-century American chemists
Chinese women biologists
Chinese women chemists
American medical researchers
Chinese medical researchers
Women medical researchers
Cancer researchers
Fellows of the American Academy of Arts and Sciences